Blockbuster is the name of four supervillains and a criminal organization appearing in American comic books published by DC Comics. The first one was primarily a foe of Batman and Robin, while the second was the archenemy to Nightwing. The latest version first appeared in the pages of the series 52 wherein he is directed into battle against Lex Luthor's team of superheroes.

Publication history
The Mark Desmond version of Blockbuster first appeared in Detective Comics #345 and was created by Gardner Fox and Carmine Infantino.

The Roland Desmond version of Blockbuster first appeared in Starman #9 and was created by Roger Stern and Tom Lyle.

Fictional character biography

Mark Desmond

The first Blockbuster was Mark Desmond, a chemist who desired to increase his physical strength. Experimenting on himself, he succeeded in making himself stronger and taller, but as a side-effect of the process he also became almost mindlessly aggressive. The mentally debilitated Desmond was cared for by his brother Roland, a local criminal, who kept their mother from discovering what Mark had done to himself.

Roland manipulated his brother into committing crimes on his behalf until they came into conflict with Batman and Robin. Bruce Wayne had once rescued a young Desmond from drowning, and he discovered that he could calm the enraged adult Desmond by removing his cowl and showing his face. Desmond later found himself clashing with Batman on various occasions.

Blockbuster absorbed energies from the Alfred Memorial which gave him some powers and was once substituted for the super-strong undead villain Solomon Grundy from Earth-Two due to a machine that was substituting people from both Earths. Green Lantern caused him to fight Solomon Grundy, leading to them both briefly getting the fight knocked out of each other. While Solomon Grundy was taken back to Earth-Two by the Justice Society of America, Blockbuster was handed over to the police by the Justice League.

Blockbuster joined the Secret Society of Super Villains briefly for a battle with the Justice League.

King Kull enlisted Blockbuster, Penguin, Queen Clea of Earth-Two, and Ibac of Earth-S to wreck Atlantis and use a cloud to sink islands. They are thwarted by Superman, Wonder Woman of Earth-Two, Green Arrow, and Spy Smasher of Earth-S.

Later, Amanda Waller recruited Desmond for her revived Suicide Squad. He was killed fighting Darkseid's creation, Brimstone.

In 2011, "The New 52" rebooted the DC universe. Mark Desmond is a patient of Dr. Phayne's. He lives on the estate and at night he undergoes procedures to enhance his intelligence. He is exposed to small amounts of a green compound intravenously. An accident is caused by a new patient believing he is in pain and the cascade of green liquid overdoses Desmond and creates an explosion. The overdose exposes a super-strong man calling himself Blockbuster. He rampages from the building in pain and knocks an attacking Hawkman unconscious. Blockbuster was later mind-controlled by Necromancer to help her steal an artifact from a Washington D.C. museum, which brought the attention of Hawk and Dove. They teamed up with Batman and Robin to stop Blockbuster and Necromancer. Mark Desmond later appears as a member of the Secret Society of Super Villains upon having been recruited by Outsider. When Catwoman breaks out of Arkham Asylum, Mark Desmond and Signalman confronted Catwoman on a rooftop, which ended with Catwoman being knocked out.

Roland Desmond

Roland Desmond became the second Blockbuster after a severe illness forced him to be treated with experimental steroids. Like his brother Mark, Roland became a child-minded super-strong monster. He ran wild in the Southwest, but Batman and Starman (Will Payton) brought his rampage to an end.

Desmond became obsessed with elevating himself greatly above his debilitated brain. A pact with the demon Neron granted him a full intellectual mind and Desmond embarked once more on a career of crime and destruction. He began his revived criminal career by causing chaos in the town of Manchester, although his schemes were foiled by the speedster, Impulse.

Desmond then moved to his mother's hometown of Blüdhaven. He forced the crime lord Angel Marin out of power and took over the city's criminal rackets. Roland's plan was to build a criminal empire in Blüdhaven that would eventually enable him to extend his dominion over Gotham, Star City, Metropolis, and New York's underworlds. For that purpose, he bought the corrupt elements of the city's police department, most notably Police Chief Redhorn and Inspector Dudley "Deadly" Soames.

Despite his swift and vicious consolidation of power, Blockbuster's hold on Blüdhaven's organized crime was nevertheless weakened by the intervention of the city's new protector, Nightwing (Dick Grayson, the former Robin), who, with Oracle's help, foiled Desmond's plans at every turn. Oracle often removes money from Blockbuster's accounts and he has a man working to stop and find Oracle, named Vogel.

Desmond's primary goal became the elimination of the young vigilante. He placed a contract on Nightwing's life, employing the services of several assassins, including Lady Vic, Stallion, Brutale, the Trigger Twins, and Shrike.

As a further result of his initial transformation, Desmond later developed albinism and a heart defect. He was restored to (comparative) health by a heart transplant from one of the talking apes of Gorilla City, and was consolidating his control over Blüdhaven and contemplating a takeover of Gotham City, when he was killed by the new Tarantula, Catalina Flores.

As part of the Blackest Night event, Roland's corpse is reanimated by a black power ring and recruited to the Black Lantern Corps.

In 2016, DC Comics implemented another relaunch of its books called "DC Rebirth", which restored its continuity to a form much as it was prior to "The New 52". Blockbuster appears asking Nightwing to help with a job.

Blockbuster III
Lex Luthor created a new Blockbuster in the pages of the miniseries event 52 to serve as an opponent of his manufactured hero team Infinity, Inc. Little is revealed about this Blockbuster, save for the fact that Luthor possesses some measure of control over his actions and level of strength. Luthor also comments that he is stronger than either of the previous two Blockbusters. This brute's cognitive abilities and appearance are very similar to the original. With controlled interference from Lex Luthor, Blockbuster kills the superhero Trajectory.

Martian Manhunter's disguise
A Blockbuster appears among the villains exiled to an alien world in Salvation Run. In issue #3, it is revealed to be a disguised Martian Manhunter.

Female Blockbuster
A newer, female Blockbuster appears in the swamps of Louisiana and fights Mon-El.

Powers and abilities
All Blockbusters have immense strength, stamina, and a high resistance to physical and energy attacks. Once transformed, most of them loses their intellect. In a straight battle, typically the greatest weakness is their comparatively slower speed, making it relatively easy to evade opposing fights, although this is of limited use if confronting Blockbuster inside buildings.

After selling his soul to Neron, Roland Desmond gained supergenius intelligence.

Other versions

Just Imagine...
In Stan Lee's Just Imagine... series, Blockbuster is reimagined as Brock Smith, a death row inmate notorious for a series of mass murders committed with his bare hands, who is rescued by the series' mysterious villain Dominic Darrk and re-empowered with extra super-strength (and a purple carapace) as part of a villainous Doom Patrol. He is defeated and de-powered by Batman and Wonder Woman (who crack his purple facade with Wonder Woman's staff), and dies after running over a live electrical cable.

In other media

Television

 The Mark Desmond incarnation of Blockbuster appears in Justice League Unlimited, voiced by Dee Bradley Baker. Following a minor appearance in the episode "Kid Stuff", Blockbuster joins Gorilla Grodd's Secret Society in the episode "I Am Legion". Prior to and during the episode "Alive!", Lex Luthor takes command of the Society, but Grodd mounts a mutiny. Blockbuster sides with the latter, only to be frozen by Killer Frost and killed off-screen by Darkseid along with Grodd's other loyalists.
 Mark Desmond appears in The Batman episode "Meltdown", voiced by Kevin Michael Richardson. This version is an African-American scientist working for Wayne Enterprises who is in charge of enforcing Ethan Bennett's parole.
 The Mark Desmond incarnation of Blockbuster appears in Batman: The Brave and the Bold, voiced by James Arnold Taylor and Kevin Michael Richardson respectively. This version is an evil prodigy who stole chemicals from S.T.A.R. Labs to create a serum capable of increasing his strength.
 The Mark Desmond incarnation of Blockbuster appears in Young Justice, voiced by René Auberjonois in season one and again by Dee Bradley Baker in season four. This version of Blockbuster was purposefully redesigned as the series creators felt the original version was too similar to Marvel Comics character the Hulk. As such, Desmond's transformation involves his Blockbuster form ripping through his human skin. Additionally, Desmond is a senior member of Project Cadmus who answers directly to their board of directors, the Light.
 Mark Desmond appears in The Flash episode "Funeral for a Friend", portrayed by an uncredited actor. This version is a criminal who stole an exo-suit from Ivo Laboratories, only to be apprehended by Team Flash.

Film
 Blockbuster was reportedly featured in David S. Goyer's unproduced screenplay for a Green Arrow film project entitled Escape from Super Max as an inmate of the titular Super Max Penitentiary for Metahumans.
 An alternate universe version of Blockbuster appears in Justice League: Gods and Monsters, voiced by Marcelo Tubert. He and a group of terrorists fight their universe's Justice League before Batman kills him.
 The Roland Desmond incarnation of Blockbuster makes a minor appearance in Batman: Bad Blood, voiced by John DiMaggio.
 The Mark Desmond incarnation of Blockbuster appears in Scooby-Doo! & Batman: The Brave and the Bold, voiced by Fred Tatasciore.
 The Roland Desmond incarnation of Blockbuster appears in Suicide Squad: Hell to Pay, voiced by Dave Fennoy. This version is one of Professor Zoom's henchmen, having joined him in exchange for "having his own island", before Blockbuster is killed by Killer Frost.

Video games
 The Mark Desmond incarnation of Blockbuster appears as a boss in Young Justice: Legacy, voiced by Mark Rolston.
 The Roland Desmond incarnation of Blockbuster appears in Batman: The Telltale Series, voiced by Steve Blum. This version has blue skin and is a member of the Children of Arkham, a group of terrorists who seek to purge Gotham City of its corruption. Blockbuster serves as second-in-command to the Penguin, who in turn answers to the group's leader Lady Arkham.

Miscellaneous
 The Roland Desmond incarnation of Blockbuster appears in Adventures in the DC Universe #1.
 The Roland Desmond incarnation of Blockbuster appears in DC Comics Presents: Wonder Woman Adventures #1.
 The Mark Desmond incarnation of Blockbuster appears in the prequel comic Batman: Arkham Knight – Genesis as an associate of the Joker, Harley Quinn, and Catman until Jason Todd kills him.

See also
 List of Batman Family enemies

References

Comics characters introduced in 1965
Comics characters introduced in 1989
DC Comics characters with superhuman strength
Fictional businesspeople
Fictional characters who have made pacts with devils
Fictional characters with superhuman durability or invulnerability
Fictional chemists
Fictional gangsters
Fictional mad scientists
DC Comics metahumans
DC Comics scientists
DC Comics supervillains
Fictional murderers
Characters created by Carmine Infantino
Fictional characters with albinism
Characters created by Gardner Fox
Characters created by Roger Stern
Suicide Squad members
Articles about multiple fictional characters